Marco António Chagas Martins (born 19 November 1956) is a Portuguese former racing cyclist. Processional from 1976 to 1990, he won the Volta a Portugal four times: in 1982, 1983, 1985 and 1986, making him the second most successful rider in the competition behind David Blanco.

Chagas is now the cycling commentator on RTP.

Major results

1976
 1st  Road race, National Road Championships
 6th Overall Volta a Portugal
1st Stages 3, 10b & 12b (ITT)
1977
 2nd Overall Grande Prémio do Minho
1st Stage 3b (ITT)
 5th Overall Volta a Portugal
1978
 1st Overall Rapport Toer
 2nd Overall 
1979
 1st Stages 3a, 6b (ITT) & 9b Volta a Portugal
 5th Overall Grande Prémio Jornal de Notícias
 5th Overall Volta ao Algarve
1981
 3rd Overall Grande Prémio Jornal de Notícias
1st Prologue (TTT)
 7th Overall Volta a Portugal
1st Stage 2 (TTT)
1982
 1st  Road race, National Road Championships
 1st  Overall Volta a Portugal
1st Stages 2 & 10b
 3rd Overall Volta ao Algarve
1983
 1st  Overall Volta a Portugal
1st Stages 7 & 11
 1st Porto–Lisboa
1984
 1st  Overall Volta ao Alentejo
1st Stage 4a (ITT)
 1st Prologue & Stages 3a (ITT) & 6b Volta a Portugal
 1st Stage 1 Grande Prémio Jornal de Notícias
 5th Overall Volta ao Algarve
1st Stage 4a
1985
 1st  Road race, National Road Championships
 1st  Overall Volta a Portugal
1st Prologue & Stages 9 & 13a (ITT)
 2nd Overall Volta ao Algarve
1st Stages 2 & 6
1986
 1st  Overall Volta a Portugal
1st Stages 4, 7 (ITT), 11a & 11b (ITT)
 1st Overall Grande Prémio do Minho
1st Stages 1, 3 & 5
 2nd Overall Volta ao Algarve
 3rd Overall Troféu Joaquim Agostinho
1987
 1st Stage 5a (ITT) Volta a Portugal
 1st Stage 1a Volta ao Alentejo
1988
 2nd Overall Volta ao Algarve
1st Stage 10
 3rd Overall Volta ao Alentejo
1989
 1st Stage 1 Troféu Joaquim Agostinho
 1st Stage 5 Grande Prémio do Minho
 2nd Overall Volta ao Alentejo
1st Stage 7b
 2nd Overall Volta ao Algarve
 7th Overall GP Costa Azul
1st Prologue (ITT) & Stage 3
 10th Overall Volta a Portugal
1990
 1st Stages 1 & 3a Volta ao Alentejo
 5th Overall Volta a Portugal
 7th Overall Troféu Joaquim Agostinho

Grand Tour general classification results timeline

References

External links
 

1956 births
Living people
Portuguese male cyclists
Volta a Portugal winners